SM U-36 was the number given to two German U-boats  and , when operating under the flag of Austria-Hungary in the Mediterranean Sea during World War I.

World War I submarines of Austria-Hungary